Margaret Wake, suo jure 3rd Baroness Wake of Liddell and Countess of Kent (c. 1297 – 19 September 1349), was the wife of Edmund of Woodstock, 1st Earl of Kent, the youngest surviving son of Edward I of England and Margaret of France.

Family
She was the daughter of John Wake, 1st Baron Wake of Liddell (son of Baldwin Wake and Hawise de Quincy) and Joan de Fiennes. By her grandmother Hawise, she was the great-granddaughter of Elen, daughter of Llywelyn the Great (Prince of Gwynedd) and Joan, Lady of Wales (the illegitimate daughter of John of England). Her mother, Joan de Fiennes, was a daughter of William de Fiennes and Blanche de Brienne. She was a sister of Margaret de Fiennes, making Wake a cousin of Roger Mortimer, 1st Earl of March (himself the great-grandson of Gwladus Ddu, Elen's sister). Joan de Fiennes also descended from John of Brienne and Berengaria of León, herself the granddaughter of Eleanor of England, Queen of Castile.

Marriages
Margaret married John Comyn (c. 1294 – 1314) around 1312, son of the John Comyn who was murdered by Robert the Bruce in 1306. Her husband John died at the Battle of Bannockburn, and their only child, Aymer Comyn (1314–1316), died as a toddler. She married, for a second time, Edmund of Woodstock, 1st Earl of Kent. They received a dispensation in October 1325, and the wedding probably took place at Christmas.

Through her marriage to Edmund of Woodstock (who was executed for treason in 1330), she was the mother of two short-lived earls of Kent, of Margaret and Joan of Kent (wife of Edward, the Black Prince). The pregnant Margaret and her children were confined to Salisbury Castle, and her brother Thomas Wake, 2nd Baron Wake of Liddell was accused of treason but later pardoned. When King Edward III of England reached his majority and overthrew the regents, he took in Margaret and her children and treated them as his own family. She succeeded briefly as Baroness Wake of Liddell in 1349, but died during an outbreak of the plague that autumn.

Via their grandson, Thomas Holland, Margaret and Edmund's descendants included both Edward IV (via Thomas's eldest and second daughters, Alinor and Joan) and Henry Tudor (via Thomas's third daughter, Margaret), from both of whom every English monarch from Henry VIII onwards descends. Thomas's daughter Margaret was also ancestor of every king of Scotland from James II, while Alinor was also ancestor of royal spouses Anne Neville and Catherine Parr.

Depictions in fiction
Margaret is a supporting character in the Karen Harper historical fiction novel The First Princess of Wales, which gives a fictional depiction of her daughter Joan of Kent's life at the English court.

Margaret is a character in the 2014 novel A Triple Knot by Emma Campion which primarily focuses on her daughter Joan of Kent's struggle to validate her secret marriage to Thomas Holland after her family forces her into a marriage with William Montacute, and her close, often uncomfortable relationship with her cousin and future husband Edward, Prince of Wales.

References 

Wake, Margaret
Wake, Margaret
Year of birth uncertain
Wake, Margaret
3
Kent
Hereditary women peers
People from Cottingham, East Riding of Yorkshire
13th-century English people
13th-century English women
14th-century English women
14th-century English people